Ralph Michael (26 September 1907 – 9 November 1994) was an English actor. He was born as Ralph Champion Shotter in London. His film appearances included Dead of Night, A Night to Remember, Children of the Damned, Grand Prix, The Assassination Bureau and Empire of the Sun.

Television credits include: The Adventures of Robin Hood, A Tale of Two Cities, Dixon of Dock Green, Danger Man, Kessler, The Forsyte Saga, Man in a Suitcase, The Avengers, Colditz, Doctor at Large, Gazette, Public Eye, Sutherland's Law, Softly, Softly, The Professionals, Rumpole of the Bailey, A Tale of Two Cities, Prince Regent, Doctor Who, Bergerac, Miss Marple, Dempsey and Makepeace, Rockliffe's Babies, Howards' Way, A Bit of Fry & Laurie and Jeeves and Wooster.

In Dempsey and Makepeace, Ralph Michael played the part of Lord Winfield, Harriet Makepeace's father, in three episodes, "Armed and Extremely Dangerous", "Make Peace not War" and "Cry God for Harry". He played Quirini in episode 28 of The Adventures of William Tell, The Avenger (1959).

Personal life
He was married twice. He was the fourth and last husband of actress Fay Compton (they divorced in 1946 after he had an affair with the actress Patricia Roc), and he was later married to actress Joyce Heron, from 1947 until her death in 1980.

Partial filmography

 False Evidence (1937) – Police Constable Barlow
 John Halifax (1938) – Phineas Fletcher
 The Girl Who Forgot (1940) – Tony Stevenage
 Front Line Kids (1942) – Paul
 Gert and Daisy Clean Up (1942) – Jack Gregory
 Women Aren't Angels (1943) – Jack
 The Bells Go Down (1943) – Dunkirk Survivor (uncredited)
 San Demetrio London (1943) – 2nd. Officer Hawkins
 For Those in Peril (1944) – P / O Rawlings
 They Came to a City (1944) – One of couple on hillside
 Dead of Night (1945) – Peter Cortland
 Johnny Frenchman (1945) – Bob Tremayne
 The Captive Heart (1946) – Capt. Thurston R.A.M.C.
 A Song for Tomorrow (1948) – Roger Stanton
 Penny and the Pownall Case (1948) – Det. Insp. Michael Carson
 The Hasty Heart (1949) – Kiwi
 The Astonished Heart (1950) – Philip Lucas
 The Sound Barrier (1952) – Fletcher
 Women Without Men (1956) – Julian Lord
 Blonde Bait (1956) – Julian Lord
 Seven Waves Away (1957) – George Kilgore
 The Birthday Present (1957) – Crowther (uncredited)
 The Supreme Secret (1958) – Sgt. Milligan
 A Night to Remember (1958) – Jay Yates
 Date at Midnight (1959) – Sir Edward Leyton
 A Taste of Money (1960) – Supt. White
 The Court Martial of Major Keller (1961) – Colonel Winch
 The Valiant (1962) – Commander Clark
 Private Potter (1962) – Padre
 Children of the Damned (1964) – Defense Minister
 Murder Most Foul (1964) – Ralph Summers
 A Jolly Bad Fellow (1964) – Superintendent Rastleigh
 He Who Rides a Tiger (1965) – Carter
 The Heroes of Telemark (1965) – Nilssen
 Khartoum (1966) – Sir Charles Dilke
 Grand Prix (1966) – Mr. Stoddard
 House of Cards (1968) – Claude de Gonde
 The Assassination Bureau (1969) – Editor (uncredited)
 The Count of Monte Cristo (1975) – M. Dantes
 Dagboek van een Oude Dwaas (1987) – Marcel Hamelinck
 Lionheart (1987) – William Nerra
 Empire of the Sun (1987) – Mr Partridge
The Camomile Lawn (1992) – older Tony

References

External links

 

1907 births
1994 deaths
Male actors from London
English male film actors
English male television actors
20th-century English male actors